List of archaeological sites in County Armagh, Northern Ireland:

 

A
Aghayalloge, Dane's Cast, linear earthwork, grid ref: J056 214 to J060 208 and J0572 2118 to J0582 2099
Aghmakane, Cashel and portal tomb: the Long Stones, grid ref: Cashel – J0206 2526, Portal tomb – J0204 2525
Annagh, World War II Pillbox, grid ref: J0138 5241
Aughadanove, Portal tomb: the Oul’ Grave, grid ref: H9991 2063
Aughnagurgan, Megalithic tomb, grid ref: H8697 2861
Aughnagurgan, Portal tomb, grid ref: H8704 2859

B
Ballard, Standing stone: the Long Stone, grid ref: J0162 2337
Ballenan, Rath, grid ref: J0340 3697
Ballinliss, Dane's Cast, linear earthwork, grid ref: J047 226 to J049 224
Ballintemple, Church: Ballymoyer Old Church, grid ref: H9641 3077
Ballyards, Enclosure, grid ref: H8647 4136
Ballybrolly, Drumcoote, Navan, Tullyargle & Tyross, Votive site and find spot of four Iron Age horns: ‘Loughnashade’, grid ref: H8518 4540
Ballydonaghy, World War II Pillbox, grid ref: J0438 5131
Ballydoo, Enclosure, grid ref: H8246 4524
Ballygorman, Rath, grid ref: J0207 3464
Ballyheridan, Hengiform enclosure, grid ref: H8804 4300
Ballymore, Rath: Forthill, grid ref: J0323 4743
Ballytyrone, Rath, grid ref: H9149 5121
Ballytyrone, Crannog in Lough Gall, grid ref: H9101 5150
Balteagh, Large hilltop enclosure, grid ref: H7978 4038
Bolton, Mound, grid ref: J0060 3542

C
Carnavanaghan, Passage tomb: Vicar's Cairn, grid ref: H9141 3974
Carran, Standing stones (remains of megalithic tomb?), grid ref: H9080 1566
Carrickananny, Souterrain, grid ref: H9919 2884
Carrickastickan, Rath, grid ref: J0240 1468
Carrickastickan, Rath, grid ref: J0155 1444
Carrickastickan, Rath and souterrain, grid ref: J0237 1443
Carrickastickan, Rath, grid ref: J0264 1400
Carrickastickan, Round cairn, grid ref: J0238 1535
Carrickbroad, Round cairn with cist: Cofracloghy, grid ref: J0383 1477
Carrickbroad, Cashel and souterrain: Issacashel, grid ref: J0506 1468
Carrickbroad, Rath, grid ref: J0408 1433
Carrickcroppan, Cross-carved boulder, grid ref: J0333 2819
Carrigans, Cashel, grid ref: H9761 1750
Carrive, Cashel: McPartland's Fort, grid ref: H9774 1775
Cashel, Cashel: the Relig, grid ref: H9036 3665
Cashel, Rectangular earthwork: the Relig, grid ref: H9720 1943
Castleraw, Castle and enclosure, grid ref: Area of H927 529
Charlemont, Artillery fort: Charlemont Fort, grid ref: H8538 5578
Clanrolla, Mound, grid ref: J0744 6266
Cloghinny, Cross-carved boulder, grid ref: J0254 1767
Clonlum, Court tomb: North Cairn (area surrounding the state care monument), grid ref: J0447 2136
Clonlum, Round cairn with portal tomb: South Cairn (area surrounding the state care monument), grid ref: J0461 2063
Clontygora, Megalithic tomb, grid ref:  J0980 1974
Clontygora, Megalithic tomb, grid ref: J0962 1834
Coney Island, Prehistoric settlement, motte and tower: Coney Keep, grid ref: Area of H938 640
Corfehan, Tynan Island Cross, grid ref: H7578 4168
Corliss, Rath and souterrain: Corliss Fort, grid ref: H8928 1689
Corporation (Armagh), Medieval dry-built masonry well, grid ref: H8772 4504
Corporation (Armagh), Windmill stump, grid ref: H8701 4517
Corran, Standing stone: the Grey Stone, grid ref: H9085 3524
Corr and Dunvally, Rath and artillery bastion, grid ref: H8482 5524
Crann, Rath, grid ref: H7725 2585
Creevekeeran, Creevekeeran Castle, grid ref: H7847 3710
Creeveroe, Crop-mark (Parallel linear ditches), grid ref: H8393 4477 to H8410 4527
Crunagh, Rath, grid ref: H9770 3439

D
Dane's Cast (South), Linear earthwork visible at several points in the following townlands:
Aghayalloge, grid ref: J056 214 to J060 208 and J0572 2118 to J0582 2099
Ballinliss, grid ref: J047 226 to J049 224
Goragh, grid ref: J070 311 to J074 312
Seafin, grid ref: J052 220 to J056 214
Dane's Cast (North), Linear earthwork visible at several points in the following townlands:
Killycapple, grid ref: H899 421 to H903 423
Killyfaddy, grid ref: H876 387 to J883 392
Latmacollum and Lisnadill, grid ref: H889 397 to H892 401
Lisnadill and Killyfaddy, grid ref: H883 392 to H889 397
Doogary and Portnelligan, Crannog, grid ref: H7831 3862
Dorsey and Tullynavall, Large earthwork and enclosure: the Dorsey Entrenchment and Standing Stone, grid ref: between H936 190 and H955 197
Dorsy (Cavan O'Hanlon) or Roxborough, Multiple cist cairn: the Moate, grid ref: H9548 2175
Drumacanver, Megalithic tomb, grid ref: H8077 3710
Drumboy, Rath: Drumboy Fort, grid ref: H9029 1160
Drumconwell, Rath, grid ref: H8734 4026
Drumconwell, Rath, grid ref: H9770 4085
Drumilly, Rath: Drumilly Fort, grid ref: J0099 2781
Drummond, Rath, grid ref: H8057 3583
Drumnasoo, Rath, grid ref: H9205 4831
Dundrum, Multivallate rath: Gordon's Fort, grid ref: H8695 3496

E
Edenappa, Ecclesiastical site and bullaun (area surrounding the state monument: Kilnasaggart), grid ref: J0619 1490
Edenderry, World War II Pillbox, grid ref: J0139 5457
Ennislare, Rath, grid ref: H8646 4120
Eshwary, Possible court tomb, grid ref: J0270 2867

F
Fairview or Mucklagh, Tynan Well Cross, grid ref: H7601 4288
Fairview or Mucklagh, Tynan Terrace Cross, grid ref: H7597 4232
Fergort, Rath, grid ref: H7883 3285
Foughill Otra, Cashel, grid ref: J0639 1764

G
Glasdrumman, Crannog, grid ref: H9645 1470
Goragh, Dane's Cast, linear earthwork, grid ref: J070 311 to J074 312
Gosford Demesne, Rath: Greer's Fort, grid ref: H9720 4139

H
Hacknahay, World War II Pillbox, grid ref: J0401 5131
Haughey's Fort, Large hilltop enclosure in Tray townland, grid ref: H8351 4529

K
Kennedies, Circular enclosure, grid ref: H7839 4355
Kilcreevy Otra, Rath, grid ref: H8376 3848
Killeen, Cashel: Lisdoo (area surrounding the state care monument), grid ref: J0815 2102
Killeen, Cashel: Lisbanemore (area surrounding the state care monument), grid ref: J0782 2013
Killycapple, Dane's Cast, linear earthwork, grid ref: H899 421 to H903 423
Killyfaddy, Dane's Cast, linear earthwork, grid ref: H876 387 to J883 392
Killyfaddy and Lisnadill, Dane's Cast, linear earthwork, grid ref: H883 392 to H889 397
Kilmore, Platform rath, grid ref: H8621 5121
Kiltybane or Lisleitrim, Multivallate rath, grid ref: H9035 2072
Kiltybane or Lisleitrim, Crannog in Lisleitrim Lough, grid ref: H8983 2042
King's Stables, Earthwork in Tray townland, grid ref: H8388 4546
Knock, World War II Pillbox, grid ref: J0413 5124

L
Latbirget, Megalithic tomb: Giant's Grave, grid ref: H9939 2162
Latmacollum and Lisnadill, Dane's Cast, linear earthwork, grid ref: H889 397 to H892 401
Levalleglish, Church: Loughgall, grid ref: H9078 5214
Lisadian, Rath, grid ref: J0094 3156
Lisadian, Rath, grid ref: J0177 3137
Lisamry, Rath: Lisamry Fort, grid ref: J8863 1490
Lisbane, Multivallate rath: Lisbane, grid ref: J0398 4440
Lisbanoe, Large enclosure, grid ref: H8552 4234
Lisdrumchor Lower, Rath, grid ref: H9810 3432
Lisdrumchor Upper, Rath, grid ref: H9775 3310
Lisglynn, Rath: Lisglyn, grid ref: H8106 3915
Liskyborough, Rath, H9310 4757
Lisloony, Bivallate rath, grid ref: H7762 4231
Lisnadill and Killyfaddy, Dane's Cast, linear earthwork, grid ref: H883 392 to H889 397
Lisnadill and Latmacollum, Dane's Cast, linear earthwork, grid ref: H889 397 to H892 401
Lisnamintry, Bivallate rath (area surrounding the state care monument), grid ref: J0462 5445
Lisraw, Rath: Lisraw Fort, grid ref: J0444 4043
Lissaraw, Rath: Lissaraw Fort, grid ref: J0222 2796
Lisslanly, Rath, grid ref: H7825 3782
Lissummon, Rath, grid ref: J0445 3459
Longstone, Standing stone: the Longstone, grid ref: H8788 4656

M
Maghery (Derrywarragh Island), Tower and enclosure: the O’Connor Stronghold, grid ref: H9299 6425 and area
Maghnavery, Rath, grid ref: H9872 3793
Manooney, Mound, grid ref: H7852 4466
Mountnorris, Rath and artillery fort, grid ref: H9952 3617
Mullaghbane, Graveyard enclosure: Kilnacrue, grid ref: H9875 1920
Mullaghglass, Rath, grid ref:  J0640 2869
Mullaghglass, Rath, grid ref: J0552 2870
Mullaghglass, Standing stone, grid ref: J0558 2862

N
Newry Canal:  Canal visible at several points in the following townlands:
Reach 1 (a): Cloghoge, Fathom Lower, Fathom Upper, grid ref: J1091 2071 to J0848 2594
Reach 2: Lisdrumgullion, grid ref: J0874 2743 to J0848 2806
Reach 3: Lisdrumgullion, grid ref: J0848 2806 to J0773 2869
Reach 4: Carnbane, Lisdrumgullion, grid ref: J0773 2869 to J0749 2936
Reach 5: Carnbane, Goragh, grid ref: J0749 2936 to J0742 3087
Reach 6: Goragh, Kilmonaghan, grid ref: J0742 3087 to J0676 3230
Reach 7: Kilmonaghan, Kilrea, Knockduff, grid ref: J0676 3230 to J0616 3433
Reach 8: Demoan, Drumbanagher, Killybodagh, grid ref: J0616 3433 to J0648 3678
Reach 9: Aughantaraghan, Demoan, grid ref: J0648 3678 to J0675 3833
Reach 10: Aughantaraghan, Federnagh, Tullynacross, grid ref: J0675 3833 to J0613 3928
Reach 11: Aughlish, Brannock, Druminargal, Federnagh, Monclone, Terryhoogan, Tullynacross, grid ref: J0613 3928 to J0638 4504
Reach 12: Terryhoogan, grid ref: J0638 4504 to J0631 4536
Reach 13: Brackagh, Cargans, Mullahead, Terryhoogan, Tullyhugh, grid ref: J0631 4536 to J0314 5117
Reach 14: Brackagh, grid ref: J0314 5117 to J0220 5246

R
Rathconvil, Rath, grid ref: J0212 3840
Rathdrumgran, Rath, grid ref: H9238 4634
Rathtrillick, Multivallate rath, grid ref: H7575 3795
Rawes, Rath: Rawes Fort, grid ref: H7927 3492
Rockmacreeny, Rath: Rockmacreeny Fort, grid ref: H9354 4635
Rockmacreeny, Rath: Thorny Fort, grid ref: H9351 4580

S
Seafin, Dane's Cast, linear earthwork, grid ref: J052 220 to J056 214
Shean, Hilltop enclosure: Carrickinaffrin, grid ref: J0040 1523

T
Tamlaght, Burial mound, grid ref: H8073 3894
Tannyoky, Rath, grid ref: J0334 3905
Tirgarriff, Mound, grid ref: H8439 4556
Tray: Large hilltop enclosure: Haughey's Fort, grid ref: H8351 4529
Tray: Earthwork: the King's Stables, grid ref: H8388 4546
Tray: Ring-ditches (6), grid ref: Area of H838 458
Tullyard, Mound, grid ref: H8747 4765
Tullyard, Rath: Tullyard Fort, grid ref: H8866 1652
Tullybrick (Hamilton), Barrow, grid ref: H7528 3953
Tullydonnell (Gage), Rath, grid ref: H9903 1456
Tullydonnell (Gage) and Ballynaclosha, Rath, grid ref: H9895 1420
Tullyglush, Rath, grid ref: H7928 3752
Tullyglush, Bivallate rath: Devlin's Fort, grid ref: H8660 3442
Tullymore, Cairn or barrow: Niall's or O’Neill's Mound, grid ref: H8618 4414
Tullyvallan, Round cairn: Harry Mount, grid ref: H9140 2317
Tullyvallan (Tipping) West, Cross-carved stone, grid ref: H9274 2333
Tullyvallan (Tipping) West, Standing stone, grid ref: H9233 2285
Tynan, Barrow, grid ref: H7715 4206

References
The main reference for all sites listed is: NI Environment Agency, Scheduled Historic Monuments (to 15 October 2012), unless otherwise indicated.

 
Armagh
County Armagh
Archaeological